The  is a Japanese railway line formerly operated by Hokkaido Railway Company (JR Hokkaido).

Stations
All stations are in Hokkaido.
Track: ∥: Double track, ∨: Double track ends, ◇: Passing loop |: No passing loop

Hakodate – Kikonai section (until March 2016)

Former Kikonai – Esashi section (closed May 2014)

History
The Goryokaku to Kamiiso section opened on 15 September 1913, and was extended to Kikonai on 25 October 1930. The Kikonai to Yunotai section opened on 10 December 1935, and was extended to Esashi on 10 November 1936.

The Goryokaku to Kikonai section was electrified on 13 March 1988 as part of the upgrading of the line associated with the opening of the Seikan Tunnel and associated Kaikyo Line linking Hokkaido to Honshu.

On 7 August 2012, JR Hokkaido announced its intention to close the  non-electrified section of the line between Kikonai and Esashi in spring 2014 due to a lack of financial viability. In fiscal 2011, the Kikonai to Esashi section was served by six return services daily, with an average patronage of 41 passengers per km daily, the lowest for any of JR Hokkaido's lines. The Kikonai – Esashi section was closed in 2014, with the last services operating on 11 May.

Operations on the remaining section of the line between Goryōkaku and Kikonai was transferred from JR Hokkaido to the newly created South Hokkaido Railway Company when the Hokkaido Shinkansen opened on 26 March 2016.

Former connecting lines

 Kamiiso station: A 500 m spur line served the Japan Cement Co factory from 1915 to 1989. A private  line transported limestone to the factory from 1921 to 1956, being electrified at 600 V DC from 1922. A second  line to a limestone quarry operated from 1949 until replaced by a conveyor belt in 1973.
 Kikonai station: In 1937, the  section to Shiriuchi opened, the beginning of a  line to serve a proposed manganese mine at Oshima. The line reached Matsumae in 1953, and closed in 1988. The last  to the manganese deposit was not constructed.

References

 This article incorporates material translated from the corresponding article in the Japanese Wikipedia.

Lines of Hokkaido Railway Company
Rail transport in Hokkaido
1067 mm gauge railways in Japan